MV Bretagne is a ferry operated by Brittany Ferries. She was built at Chantiers de l'Atlantique shipyard in Saint-Nazaire, France and has been sailing for Brittany Ferries since 1989.

Service history
MV Bretagne was ordered by Brittany Ferries in the late 1980s in order to increase capacity on BF's routes, and to set a new standard in on-board facilities. Bretagne was one of the first true cruise-ferries, offering cruise-type facilities on a ferry route. Built by Chantiers de l'Atlantique,
Bretagne was launched on 4 February 1989  and entered service on 16 July the same year. Bretagne'''s interior was furnished in typical 'Breton' decor featuring original artwork by the Scottish painter Alexander Goudie.Bretagne was used on the Poole-Cherbourg route between 26 February 2007 and 10 March 2007. She then became the only current passenger vessel in the Brittany Ferries fleet to visit every port served by the company and to have operated on all the current routes. It was originally planned that she would return to Poole in January 2008 to cover for the absence of the Cotentin. In addition to sailing to Cherbourg alongside the Barfleur she would also have sailed between Poole and Santander at the weekend departing Poole on Friday night and arriving back on Monday morning. This plan was dropped shortly after the publication of the 2008 timetable and Bretagne instead covered for the refit on the Mont St Michel on the Portsmouth-Caen route.

In early 2009 Bretagne underwent a £5million refit. The work included creation of 50 'Club 4' cabins along with refurbishment of the rest of the ships cabins, refurbishment of the self-service restaurant, refit of the 'La Gerbe de Locronan Salon de Thé' to create a WiFi cafe area and rebuilding of the reclining seat lounges to create new lounge areas for business, reading and watching television.Voyage Magazine Winter 2008

On Monday 22 June 2015, Jean-Marc Roue, president of Brittany Ferries announced that a new vessel was to be ordered sometime in 2016. MV Bretagne is likely to be sold or scrapped. However the new ship was cancelled and so these ships would continue to serve their current routes.

On 20 July 2021, Brittany Ferries announced at a press conference in Paris that it had secured a charter with Stena RoRo for 2 more E-Flexers. One of these new vessels, to be named 'Saint-Malo' will replace Bretagne on the Portsmouth-Saint Malo route, The other vessel is to replace the 1992 'Normandie' on the Portsmouth to Ouistreham (Caen) route. 'Saint Malo' is expected to be delivered in 2024 and enter service in 2025.

 Routes Bretagne currently serves the Portsmouth to St Malo route daily but has seen use on Portsmouth-Caen (Ouistreham) as refit cover and also the winter only route of Plymouth-St Malo. She also sailed between Portsmouth and Santander during the winter in the mid-nineties.

Though generally found on the Portsmouth to St Malo route Bretagne will also operate on other routes, normally in Winter, such as Portsmouth to Cherbourg and Plymouth to Roscoff.Bretagne'' has previously been used on Spanish routes, operating between Plymouth and Santander. Bretagne also sailed between Roscoff and Cork summer only service for a number of years.

References

External links 

Ferries of the United Kingdom
Ferries of France
Ships built by Chantiers de l'Atlantique
1989 ships